Marcetta York Darensbourg is an American inorganic chemist. She is a Distinguished Professor of Chemistry at Texas A&M University. Her current work focuses on iron hydrogenases and iron nitrosyl complexes.

Early life 
Marcetta Bernice (York) Darensbourg was born May 4, 1942, in Artemus, Kentucky. She is daughter to school teachers, Atlas H. York, and Elsie Walton York. She has an older sister named Mary Lucille York, and a younger brother named Larry Hercules York. Darensbourg attended a local high school named Knox Central High School in Barbourville, Kentucky. In high school, she was a studious pupil and was a member of the band, choir, and cheerleading team. This is where Darensbourg met her role model, Mrs. Bolton. Mrs. Bolton taught biology, physics, and chemistry which interested Darensbourg. One of the reasons Darensbourg wanted to go into science and teach was from the great influence that Mrs. Bolton left on her.

Education
Darensbourg received a B.S. in Chemistry from Union College in 1963, and a Ph.D. in inorganic chemistry from the University of Illinois under the guidance of Theodore L. Brown in 1967. Her doctoral work focused on the kinetic studies of organolithium reactions.

Career
Darensbourg was an assistant professor at Vassar College from 1967to 1969. From 1971 to 1982, she taught at Tulane University, attaining the rank of professor. In 1982, Marcetta Darensbourg was appointed professor at Texas A&M University together with Donald J. Darensbourg. She was subsequently awarded the title of Distinguished Professor in 2010. Her research interests include bimetallic hydrogenase enzymes containing CO and CN ligands.

Darensbourg is a member of the board of Inorganic Syntheses, where she also served as the editor-in-chief of volume 32. In 2011, she was elected fellow of the American Academy of Arts and Sciences.

Research projects

Organolithium chemistry
Darensbourg investigated certain kinetic aspects of organolithium compounds. During the course of these studies, the kinetics of the rate-determining step of tert-butyllithium dissociation from tetramer to a dimer were analyzed. Using mass spectroscopy, the existence of cross-association with other organolithium species in the vapor phase could also be observed.

Metal carbonyl chemistry 
Darensbourg's interest in charge distribution molecules that could be probed with reactivity led to her work on mapping nucleophilic attack on metal carbonyls. Infrared, nuclear magnetic resonance and electronic spectroscopy of some carbene pentacarbonyl complexes of chromium(0) and tungsten(0) indicated that carbene ligands are better sigma donors than a carbonyl ligand, while simultaneously behaving as strong pi acceptors. Substitutions of iron and cobalt sites were made to see how the CO strength force constants affected the nucleophilic attacks. The substitutions illustrated that the nucleophilic attacks always occurred at the CO group with the greater force constant when there is a choice of carbonyl groups present in a molecule.

Hydrogenase mimics 
Darensbourg has pioneered the development of synthetic mimics of hydrogenase enzymes. These include synthetic complexes featuring Fe-based organometallics species, which serve as precursor for producing iron only Hydrogenase enzyme active site. These enzymes are capable of carry out reaction even in the absence of the protein-based active site organization or carry out the proton production with high efficiencies. However, these hydrogenase enzymes were found to be highly sensitive with oxygen (O2), which can over oxidize and inactivate them. Even after the oxygen was removed, they do not regain catalytic activity immediately, requiring multiple steps to do so.

Metallodithiolates chemistry 

In the beginning of 2017, Darensbourg shifted her focus to studying the metallodithiolates ligands, which act as building blocks for the synthesis of various bimetallic enzyme active sites. The ligands can act as a catalyst to carry out different reactions, depending on which transition metal being at the center.

Darensbourg et al. reported that metallodithiolates ligands with nickel centers can increase the electron density of bonds such as Fe-S, allowing them to be cleaved easily. Darensbourg et al. also determined that this nickel center complex associated with a lead atom also plays an important role in the addition of CO and ethylene in the Suzuki-Miyaura reaction, which couples the organic compounds of boron and the halides, along alkyl halides and alkylboranes. Furthermore, with the cCobalt center, the metallodithiolates ligands can catalyze the transfer of NO and nitrosylate moieties, which allows the glycosidase conjugation of dinitrosyl iron complexes. With this conjugation, other carbohydrates can achieve higher potential in attaching for drug delivery.

External links
Voices of Inorganic Chemistry Interview - Donald J. Darensbourg and Marcetta Y. Darensbourg (YouTube link)

References

21st-century American chemists
Inorganic chemists
Texas A&M University faculty
Fellows of the American Academy of Arts and Sciences
Living people
Year of birth missing (living people)